The Cascais Line is a Portuguese railway line which connects the municipalities of Lisbon, Oeiras, and Cascais. The line starts in Lisbon, at Cais do Sodré and ends in Cascais. On the Lisbon urban trains' diagram it is shown in yellow . The first section, from Cascais to Pedrouços, was opened in 1889. The line was completed in 1895. It was the first heavy rail line to be electrified in Portugal, in 1926, and the last to be integrated into CP, in 1977. In July, 2020, CP announced that the line is slated to be converted from 1500 V DC electrification, to 25 kV AC, to match the rest of the network. Signalling will also be upgraded and new trains acquired.

See also 
 List of railway lines in Portugal
 List of Portuguese locomotives and railcars
 History of rail transport in Portugal

References

Sources

 

Cas
Iberian gauge railways
Railway lines opened in 1889